Antonio or Antonio d'Ariodante Buonfigli (1680 - circa 1750) was an Italian painter of the late-Baroque period.

Biography
He was born and active in Siena. Leonardo Massimiliano de Vegni, an engraver, was one of his pupils. Buonfigli painted a Baptism of St Trofimo found in the Pinacoteca Nazionale di Siena.

An inventory of works in Siena from 1840, listed the following works:
Paintings, Sacristy of the Oratorio del Rosario.
Paintings, Educatorio di Santa Maria Maddalena
Crucifix, Badia Nuova
Dead Jesus altarpiece, Parish church of Santo Stefano alla Lizza
Painting, Oratorio degli Artisti, Church of San Vigilio
Santa Cecilia, Sacristy of Siena Cathedral
Painting, Pieve di San Giovanni

An Antonio Buonfigli (1794 - 1874) from Lucca was known as a singer and musician.

References

1680 births
1750 deaths
17th-century Italian painters
Italian male painters
18th-century Italian painters
Painters from Siena
Italian Baroque painters
18th-century Italian male artists